James Michael Kelly (2 February 1808 – 18 August 1875) was an Irish Repeal Association politician.

He was educated at Trinity College, Dublin and also served on Limerick Town Council and as High Sheriff of County Limerick in 1841.

In 1834, he married Frances Maria Roche, daughter of Edward Roche of Trabolgan and Kildinan and Margaret Honoria née Curtain, with whom he had at least one child: John Joseph Roche Kelly (1835–1898).

References

External links
 

UK MPs 1841–1847
Irish Repeal Association MPs
1808 births
1875 deaths
High Sheriffs of County Limerick
Alumni of Trinity College Dublin
Members of the Parliament of the United Kingdom for County Limerick constituencies (1801–1922)